Río Hondo Department is a department of Argentina in Santiago del Estero Province. The capital city of the department is situated in Termas de Río Hondo.

References

Departments of Santiago del Estero Province